Fan Ye may refer to:

 Fan Ye (Han Dynasty), Eastern Han Dynasty official
 Fan Ye (historian) (398–445), Liu Song Dynasty historian and politician, compiler of Book of the Later Han
 Fan Ye (gymnast) (born 1986), former Chinese gymnast
 Nickname for Fan Bingbing